Pee Wee Gaskins (often abbreviated as PWG or Peskins) is a rock band from Indonesia formed in 2007. The lineup consists of Dochi, Sansan, Ayi, Homo, and Aldy. They have released six albums, Stories From Our High School Years (2008), The Sophomore (2009), Ad Astra Per Aspera (2010), A Youth Not Wasted (2016), Salute to 90's (2018), and Mixed Feeling (2019).

Name
Sansan and Dochi wanted a serial killer as a name for their band, after doing some research on the internet, they found Donald Henry Gaskins, an American serial killer and chose his nickname, "Pee Wee," as their band's name.

Career
In April 2007, the band released first their EP, Stories from Our High School Years through Knurd Records and sold 2000 copies.

In early 2009, the band released its first full-length album, The Sophomore through Variant Records and sold more than 20,000 copies.

In 2010, Ad Astra Per Aspera was released. This album features reduced synthesizers and notably different lyrics compared to their two previous albums.

In 2016, Pee Wee Gaskins signed to Universal Music Indonesia and released third album, A Youth Not Wasted. They also served as an opening act for Australian band, 5 Seconds of Summer's Sound Live Feels Live World Tour at the Indonesia Convention Exhibition in Jakarta, Indonesia.

In 2018, Pee Wee Gaskins released a mini album, it's called "Salute To 90's". It features 5 cover songs of Indonesia's 90's greatest hits.

In 2019, Pee Wee Gaskins released new full-length album, it's called "Mixed Feeling". The album cover was made by Dochi's son and the sleeve boxset cover was made by the son of senior music journalist Adib Hidayat, named Jemima. This album was produced by Erix Soekamti personnel from the band called "Endank Soekamti".

Fans
Fans of the band have several names, including Party Dorks, Dorkzilla, and Tatiana. The band also had a short-lived anti-fan group called Anti-Pee Wee Gaskins, abbreviated as APWG, but APWG has not appeared since 2009 .

Band members
Current members
 Alditsa "Dochi" Sadega — vocals, bass guitar (2007-present)
 Fauzan "Sansan" — vocals, guitar (2007-present)
 Harry "Ayi" Pramahardhika — guitar, backing vocals (2008-present)
 Reza "Homo" Satiri — keyboard, synthesizer, piano, backing vocals (2007-present)
 Renaldy "Aldy" Prasetya — drums, Percussion (2008-present)

Former members
 Andhika "Tlor" - bass guitar (2007-2008)

Discography

References

External links
  (Dead. Checked July 06, 2020)

Indonesian rock music groups
Musical groups established in 2008